MTV Force India The Fast and The Gorgeous is a reality show by MTV India produced in association with Indian Formula 1 team Force India. The show’s concept was to find four new face of Force India F1 for the 2009 season.

The show was hosted by the VJ Rannvijay Singh.

MTV India did not commission a second series. In 2011, Force India partnered with NDTV Good Times for a second season, presented by Ambika Anand.

References

External links
 Official Site

Indian reality television series
Formula One mass media
2009 Indian television series debuts
MTV (Indian TV channel) original programming